The Forbes Road School District is a rural public school district located in Fulton County, Pennsylvania, U.S. It serves the townships of Dublin, Taylor and Wells. The district encompasses approximately 105 square miles. According to 2000 federal census data, it serves a resident population of 3,043.

Schools

The district has two schools, Forbes Road Elementary School and Forbes Road Junior Senior High School, connected in the same building. The school campus is located at 159 Red Bird Drive, between the villages of Hustontown and Waterfall in Taylor Township.

Extracurriculars
The district's students have access to a variety of clubs, activities and sports.

Athletics
 Baseball - Class A
 Basketball - Class A
 Girls Field Hockey - Class AA
 Boys Soccer - Class A
 Softball - Class A
 Tennis - Class AA

References

External links 
 
 PIAA
 Tuscarora Intermediate Unit

School districts in Fulton County, Pennsylvania